is a railway station in the city of  Noda, Chiba, Japan, operated by the private railway operator Tōbu Railway. The station is numbered "TD-18".

Lines

Station layout

Shimizu-kōen Station has one ground-level island platform serving two tracks. The platform is linked to entrance on the east and west entrances by an underground passage. The former platform 1 (a side platform) is no longer in use.

Platforms

Adjacent stations

History

Shimizu-kōen Station opened on 1 September 1929. The station building was reconstructed as an underground structure, which was completed on 12 March 2007. From 17 March 2012, station numbering was introduced on the Tobu Noda Line, with Shimizu-kōen Station becoming "TD-15".

Passenger statistics
In fiscal 2018, the station was used by an average of 5,101 passengers daily. The passenger figures for previous years are as shown below.

Surrounding area
Shimizu Park
Chiba Prefectural Shimizu High School
Noda-Shimizu Post Office
Bujinkan Ishizuka Dojo

See also
 List of railway stations in Japan

References

External links

 Tobu Railway station information 

Railway stations in Chiba Prefecture
Railway stations in Japan opened in 1929
Tobu Noda Line
Stations of Tobu Railway
Noda, Chiba